This is a list of lighthouses in Venezuela.

Lighthouses

See also
 Lists of lighthouses and lightvessels

References

External links

 

Lighthouses in Venezuela
Venezuela
lighthouses of Venezuela
lighthouses of Venezuela